Smarty Jones (February 28, 2001) is a champion Thoroughbred racehorse who won the 2004 Kentucky Derby and Preakness Stakes and came second in the Belmont Stakes.

Background
Born at Fairthorne Farm in Chester County, Pennsylvania, the horse was named after Milly "Smarty Jones" McNair, the mother of co-owner Pat Chapman. The two shared a birthday, and Mrs. Chapman wanted to honor her late mother. She said the horse was a strong-willed actor from birth and her mother too was a bit of a smart aleck as a child who had gotten the nickname "Smarty."

He is a third-generation descendant of Mr. Prospector, and as such Smarty Jones is related to many recent Triple Crown hopefuls including Funny Cide, Afleet Alex, and Fusaichi Pegasus. Also included in his pedigree are Triple Crown winners Secretariat, Count Fleet, War Admiral, Gallant Fox and Omaha, and such other Triple Crown race winners as Northern Dancer, Foolish Pleasure and Man o' War, who is #1 on the list of Blood-Horse magazine List of the Top 100 U.S. Racehorses of the 20th Century.  His dam was multiple stakes winner I'll Get Along.

Pat Chapman and her husband, Roy "Chappy" Chapman, originally hired Bobby Camac to train Smarty Jones, but in December 2001, Camac and his wife were murdered by Camac's stepson, Wade Russell, who was eventually convicted and sentenced to 28 years in prison. "It was a total shock, numbing," Roy Chapman said. "We didn't know what to do next." This tragedy, combined with Roy Chapman's failing health, resulted in the Chapmans' decision to disband their small breeding operation, retaining only two of their horses. One was Smarty Jones, the product of a breeding between their winningest horse, the mare I'll Get Along, and the stallion Elusive Quality. Despite these influences, his Dosage Index of 3.40 suggested that he was capable of competing in the classics. In 2002, Smarty Jones was sent to Bridlewood Farm in Ocala, Florida, to prepare for racing.

Racing career

2003: Two-Year-Old Season
In 2003, the Chapmans gave Smarty Jones to John Servis for training. They sold the Someday Farm property and moved into a smaller home, training only four horses. On July 27, 2003, Servis was schooling Smarty Jones at the starting gate when the colt spooked, reared, and smashed his head on the top of the gate. He fell to the ground unconscious, blood pouring from his nostrils. Servis thought the horse was dead, but Smarty Jones regained consciousness and was treated by Dr. Dan Hanf, who stopped the hemorrhaging and treated him for shock. After the bleeding stopped, the colt's head began to swell from the middle of his forehead over to his left eye. Dr. Hanf and assistant trainer Maureen Donnelly kept watch on the horse and kept him at the barn overnight. Hanf had seen the eye before the swelling and was confident the eye itself was not damaged but knew the horse must have sustained a fracture due to the excessive swelling. The colt was sent the next day, July 28, 2003, to the New Jersey Equine Clinic for x-rays. There he was diagnosed with a fractured skull. The bones around his left eye were so badly damaged that the veterinarians thought they might have to remove the eye. Smarty Jones overcame his injuries after three weeks in the hospital and spent more than a month recuperating on the farm. Two of the other entrants in the 2004 Kentucky Derby lacked sight in one eye, and Smarty Jones could have been the third.

Servis led him back into training and by early November 2003, the colt had recovered completely and was ready to make his racing debut at nearby Philadelphia Park (now known as Parx Racing and Casino), a racetrack in Bensalem, Pennsylvania, a suburb of Philadelphia. Canadian-born jockey Stewart Elliott was hired to ride Smarty Jones initially for the Bensalem race but took over a more permanent position when the horse began his winning streak. Elliot had won 3,300 races and was the son of jockey  Dennis Elliott, Smarty Jones won the six-furlong  race by 7¾ lengths. Two weeks later, he won the Pennsylvania Nursery Stakes by 15 lengths, earning the best speed figure of his generation and among the best of any Derby winner as a 2 year old.

2004: Three-Year-Old Season
In January 2004, now racing as a three-year-old, Smarty Jones was given his first major test in the Count Fleet Stakes at Aqueduct Racetrack in New York City. In the home stretch, the colt pulled away from the field to win by 5 lengths. In February, Smarty Jones was shipped to Oaklawn Park racetrack in Hot Springs, Arkansas in preparation for the Kentucky Derby. There, he won the Southwest Stakes, the Rebel Stakes (earning the fastest Thorograph number that had ever been given to a 3 year old), and the important Arkansas Derby.

On a rainy May 1, 2004, Smarty Jones entered the Kentucky Derby, where he became the post time favorite, and won. He became the first unbeaten winner of the race since Seattle Slew in 1977. Servis and Elliott became the first trainer/jockey combination in 25 years to win the Kentucky Derby in their debut appearance. Smarty Jones won the race by 2¾ lengths, earning $854,800 for the Chapmans along with a bonus of $5 million from Oaklawn Park for sweeping the Rebel Stakes, the Arkansas Derby, and the Kentucky Derby. He also joined Lil E. Tee (1992 Derby winner) as the only Pennsylvania-bred horses to ever win the Kentucky Derby. Smarty Jones' year, 2004, was the 100th anniversary of the Triple Crown races.

On May 15, after appearing on the cover of Sports Illustrated, Smarty Jones won the second leg of the Triple Crown with a victory at the 2004 Preakness Stakes by a record margin of 11½ lengths, becoming the first odds-on favorite to win the race since Spectacular Bid in 1979.

After his Preakness victory, Smarty Jones' popularity increased and he became, arguably, the #1 fan favorite to aspire to win the Triple Crown since Affirmed won it in 1978.  He was the 10th horse since Affirmed to win both the Derby and the Preakness. His popularity increased the attendance of the races by 17,000 people and caused the highest television ratings in 14 years. Breeders made offers for the breeding rights to the horse, with the offers going as high as 40 to 50 million dollars.  However, on June 5, 2004, Smarty Jones finished  second in the Belmont Stakes, upset by a late charge by 36-1 long shot Birdstone.   Speculation arose that the loss was a result of Elliott allowing Smarty Jones to assume the lead too early when being challenged by several competitors.  However, neither Servis nor the Chapmans ever blamed his own jockey (Race video revealed that Elliott had a tight hold on the reins, and did not urge Smarty Jones until the quarter pole). Others pointed to Smarty Jones' relatively unfavorable 3.40 Dosage Index as being a portent of his inability to successfully negotiate the 1½-mile Belmont distance (Birdstone's Dosage Index was 1.77; the lower the Dosage number, supposedly the better suited a horse is to longer races). Smarty Jones ran the opening mile and a quarter in a time that would have won all but 3 Kentucky Derbys in history and was 8 lengths in front of the show horse.  The 120,139 in attendance at Belmont Park that day marked the largest crowd ever to see a sporting event in New York.

Smarty Jones carried a record-high $59,000,000 betting pool for the Preakness Stakes, which doubled in amount during the Belmont Stakes.

The Belmont was Smarty Jones' only loss out of nine starts and the first time he had ever been passed in a race. Many speculated against his distance abilities. Although he ranked among the most brilliantly fast 2 and 3 year olds of recent years, the 1 1/2 mile distance of the Belmont might have proven too far for his miler/sprinter pedigree and running style. Failing to relax as he had done in the Derby and Preakness, he set a blistering pace on the front end. Birdstone, with a more distance-favoring pedigree, rallied from well off the pace, and for the first time in his career Smarty Jones was passed in a race. In many ways, his career mirrored that of Majestic Prince, who fell short of winning the 1969 Triple Crown.  Both horses entered the Belmont undefeated, finished second, and never raced again.

Smarty Jones was voted the 2004 Eclipse Award for Outstanding Three-Year-Old Male Horse and was one of the top 5 searched words/terms on Google for that year.

Quote by Smarty Jones' stable foreman, "Big Bill" Foster: "Number one in horse racing, you have to have the horse. Number two, you have to know what to do with the horse once you have him. A lot of people in this business have a lot of horses, and never made it because they broke them down. It happens a lot. Mismanaged. Mistrained. All because people want to be in the limelight. Which is where we're different. We don't want to be in the limelight."

Stud career
The end of his racing career was announced on August 2, 2004, due to chronic bruising of his ankle bones.  Smarty Jones finished his career with 8 wins and one place in nine starts, earning $2,613,155.  He also earned a $5 million bonus from Oaklawn Park. His total earnings were $7,613,155.

Smarty Jones stood at stud at Three Chimneys Farm in Midway, Kentucky, and at one point occupied the same stall that had previously housed Triple Crown winner Seattle Slew. Smarty Jones' first foals were born in 2006 and began racing in 2008. He now stands at Rodney Eckenrode's Equistar Farm near Annville, Pa. and has sired numerous stakes winners, many graded, including Grade I winner Centralinteligence (bred by Pat Chapman, breeder/owner of Smarty Jones), Singapore Derby winning filly Better Life, Japanese record setter Keiai Gerbera, Panama Champion Smart DNA, Uruguayan Champion 2 years Bamba y Bamba and Backtalk, winner of the 2009 GIII Bashford Manor Stakes at Churchill Downs and GII Sanford Stakes at Saratoga Racecourse and a stallion at Bridlewood in Florida, to name a few.

He now has an early Kentucky Derby prep at Oaklawn named in his honor, the Smarty Jones Stakes, as well as a Labor Day race at Parx Racing and Casino that was inaugurated in 2010 as a replacement for the Pennsylvania Derby, which moved to the final Saturday in September. In addition, a statue will stand at Parx in his honor.
Statue at Parx Bensalem PA
For the 2016 breeding season, Smarty Jones was relocated to Calumet Farm in Lexington, Kentucky, after shipping to Uruguay for the Southern Hemisphere season.  Smarty Jones had his first grade I winner with Centralinteligence who won the 2013 GI Triple Bend Handicap.

Nasa won the Pennsylvania Nursery Stakes in 2014, the same race his sire Smarty Jones won in 2003.

Race record

Pedigree

In popular culture 
New Yorker and rapper Wiki released a single entitled "Smarty Jones" as part of the two song release, "Fee Fi Fo Fum b/w Smarty Jones" on October 18, 2019.

See also
 List of historical horses

Further reading
 In 2008, Middle Atlantic Press published Barbaro, Smarty Jones & Ruffian: The People's Horses written by Linda Hanna.
 In 2004, Sports Publishing published "Smarty Jones: America's Horse" written by Peter Bannon.
 In 2004, BookSurge published Quips, quotes & oats: Smarty Jones Talks written by Robert L. Merz
 In 2009, Greenwood Press published Encyclopedia of Sports in America, Volume 2, 1940 – Present, edited by Murry R. Nelson
 In 2004, Braveheart Press published Smarty Jones: Forever a champion, written by Billy Valentine

References

External links
Smarty Jones pedigree
Smarty Jones Facebook page

Preakness winners
Smarty Jones: Three-year-old Male of the Year

Smarty Jones information and merchandise, HorseHats.com

2001 racehorse births
Racehorses bred in Pennsylvania
Racehorses trained in the United States
Kentucky Derby winners
Preakness Stakes winners
Eclipse Award winners
American Grade 1 Stakes winners
Thoroughbred family 1-x